Adele: Live in New York City was Adele's one-night-only show at Radio City Music Hall, which took place on November 17, 2015. The show was directed by Beth McCarthy-Miller and broadcast on NBC on December 14, 2015. Jimmy Fallon served as the host, while Adele, Jonathan Dickins, and Lorne Michaels served as its executive producers.

Songs performed
"Hello"
"All I Ask"
"Set Fire to the Rain"
"Skyfall"
"Someone like You"
"Million Years Ago"
"When We Were Young"
"Rolling in the Deep"

Songs not included in the original network broadcast
"Water Under the Bridge"
"One and Only"
"Hometown Glory"
"Chasing Pavements"
"Daydreamer"

Reception

Adele Live in New York City averaged 11.3 million viewers and a 3.0 rating among adults 18–49, which represents the highest rating among adults for a prime-time concert special since the Eagles' 2005 Farewell Tour. The special also retained the viewership of The Voice lead-in, which was the highest-rated series of the night, with an average 3.2 rating in the key demo.

Awards and nominations

See also

 2015 in American television
 Adele at the BBC
 Adele One Night Only

References

External links
 

Adele
2015 in American television
2015 in music
2015 in New York City
2015 television specials
2010s American television specials
2010s in Manhattan
Concerts in the United States
English-language television shows
Events in New York City
Music television specials
NBC television specials
Radio City Music Hall
Television shows directed by Beth McCarthy-Miller